William Desmond Anthony Pertwee,  (21 July 1926 – 27 May 2013) was a British comedy actor. He played the role of  Chief ARP Warden Hodges in the sitcom Dad's Army.

Early life
Pertwee was born in Amersham, Buckinghamshire, on 21 July 1926. Born the youngest of three boys of a Brazilian mother and an English father, James Francis Carter Pertwee, who travelled the country as a salesman until he became ill and died in 1938, when Bill Pertwee was 12. The family moved home many times during Pertwee's childhood and he lived in Hereford, Glasbury, Colnbrook, Newbury, Erith, Belvedere, Blackheath, Storrington, Westcliff-on-Sea, Wilmington and Worthing.

His education was disrupted by the moves and he attended many schools including an independent convent school, a small independent school, followed by Frensham Heights School in Surrey, Dartford Technical College and Southend College.

Pertwee left school during the Second World War and worked for a company that made parts for Spitfire cannon. He was declared unfit for RAF service as he was on medication following a swimming accident, but was a member of the Air Training Corps (UK Air Cadets). He later worked as an accounts clerk at the Stock Exchange and as a salesman for the clothing retailer Burberry in London.

Entertainment career
Pertwee appeared in the radio comedy series Beyond Our Ken (1959–1964) and Round the Horne (1965–1967). He was also a warm-up act for many television shows.

His most prominent role was that of ARP Warden Hodges in Dad's Army, which he played in both the original television series from 1968 to 1977, and the radio adaptations, as well as the radio sequel It Sticks Out Half a Mile, set after the war. Pertwee was president of the Dad's Army Appreciation Society and the author of the book Dad's Army – The Making of a Television Legend.

In July 2008 he and other surviving members of the Dad's Army cast gathered together at the Imperial War Museum on the 40th anniversary of the show's first broadcast in 1968. He also made appearances on This Morning. In 1975 he took part in the Dad's Army stage show and with Norman Macleod released the Dad's Army single "Get Out And Get Under The Moon", with Pertwee's B-side song "Hooligans" on EMI.

Pertwee appeared in two Carry On films – Carry On Loving (1970) and Carry On Girls (1973). His appearance in Carry On at Your Convenience (1971) was cut from the final film. His other film appearances include  The Magnificent Seven Deadly Sins (1971), Psychomania (1973), as postmen in the film versions of Love Thy Neighbour and Man About the House, Confessions of a Pop Performer (1975), What's Up Nurse! (1977) and What's Up Superdoc! (1978).

On television Pertwee appeared in the final episode of It Ain't Half Hot Mum (1981) and an episode of Hi-de-Hi! (1986). He played PC Wilson in You Rang, M'Lord? (1988–1993), another creation of Jimmy Perry and David Croft.

The subject of This Is Your Life in 1999, Pertwee was surprised by Michael Aspel at the Imperial War Museum. In 2006, he performed in the World Cup song, "Who Do You Think You Are Kidding Jurgen Klinsmann?"

Pertwee died aged 86 on 27 May 2013. He had been ill since the previous year and died peacefully at his home in Cornwall. Three days previously he had attended a parade in Thetford (home of the Dad's Army Museum) where spectators and museum volunteers remarked how frail he was looking. His death, and those of Pamela Cundell in 2015 and Frank Williams in 2022, leaves Ian Lavender, who played Private Pike, as the only surviving Dad's Army cast member.

In 2011 a portrait of Pertwee, painted by a local artist, was unveiled in the Dad's Army Museum, Thetford where it now resides. Pertwee was patron of the museum and of the DAAS (Dad's Army Appreciation Society) until his death.

Personal life

Pertwee married Marion Macleod, sister of John and Norman Macleod of the Maple Leaf Four, in 1955. They had a son, Jonathan James Pertwee (born in 1966), who has appeared in various TV programmes.

Following the death of his wife, he lived in Topsham, Devon. He was awarded an MBE in the Queen's 2007 Birthday Honours list for his services to charity. He was vice-president of the "Railway Ramblers" and a member of the executive committee of the Entertainment Artistes' Benevolent Fund ('The Royal Variety Charity') and was initiated in 1976 as a member of the Grand Order of Water Rats.

Pertwee's brother James Raymond "Jiggy" Pertwee was an RAF Whitley Bomber pilot who was killed in a crash on a hillside close to a disused quarry above Bank Foot, near Ingleby Greenhow in North Yorkshire, following a leaflet drop over Dortmund, Germany, in June 1941.

He was related to Michael Pertwee and Jon Pertwee, being a second cousin of Michael's and Jon's father, the screenwriter and actor Roland Pertwee. He was godfather to one of the sons of his Dad's Army co-star Ian Lavender.

Film/TV/radio

Film

Television

Radio

References

External links

 

1926 births
2013 deaths
Actors from Amersham
British male comedy actors
English male comedians
English male radio actors
English male television actors
English people of Brazilian descent
English writers
Male actors from Buckinghamshire
Male actors from Cornwall
Members of the Order of the British Empire
People educated at Frensham Heights School
People from Truro
Bill
Royal Air Force personnel of World War II